Mongrel Media is an independent Canadian film distributor established in 1994 by Hussain Amarshi. It is the exclusive Canadian theatrical distributor for Sony Pictures Classics, Neon, and Lionsgate and titles from A24, Amazon Studios, Saban Films, and IFC Films. Mongrel Media is represented in Quebec by Métropole Films Distribution. In January 2014, it also acquired Canadian distribution rights to 300 film titles from the StudioCanal library. Titles sold under the Mongrel International umbrella included Neon's Beach Rats and A24's first foreign language film Menashe. In January 2020, Mongrel Media was confirmed as the Canadian distributor for the ninth installment of the Saw franchise, Spiral: From the Book of Saw.

In 2021 the company launched its own proprietary streaming service, offering a selection of films from both its catalogue and that of the American Magnolia Pictures available from its website for a subscription fee of $6.99 per month.

References

External links 
 

Companies based in Toronto
Mass media companies established in 1994
Film distributors of Canada
Canadian video on demand services